The Centre for Cultural Decontamination (Centar za kulturnu dekontaminaciju) is an independent cultural institution located in Belgrade, Serbia. The centre was established in 1994 as a response to the political and cultural climate in Serbia. The centre works against "nationalism, xenophobia, intolerance, hatred and fear." The institute functions as a gallery, community and a professional forum. It was founded by Borka Pavićević, previously a principal of the Yugoslav Drama Theater.

Criticism

See also
Group MOST

References

External links
 

Organizations established in 1994
1994 establishments in Serbia
Cultural organizations based in Serbia
Nonviolence organizations based in Serbia
Organizations based in Belgrade